The Avondale School District is a school district headquartered in Auburn Hills, Michigan, in Metro Detroit.

The district educates approximately 3,844 students, and covers southeast Auburn Hills, northeast Bloomfield Township, southwest Rochester Hills and northwest Troy, Michigan. The school district is named such because Rochester Hills used to be named Avon Township. The school district was formed in 1947.

Schools

Elementary schools
Auburn Elementary
Deerfield Elementary
R. Grant Graham Elementary
Woodland Elementary

Middle schools
Avondale Middle School

High schools
Avondale Academy
Avondale High School

References

Schools. Avondale School District. Retrieved on 2008-03-17.

External links

 

Education in Oakland County, Michigan
Schools in Auburn Hills, Michigan
Schools in Troy, Michigan
School districts in Michigan
1947 establishments in Michigan
School districts established in 1947